In Norse mythology, Gyllir is a horse listed in both Grímnismál and Gylfaginning among the steeds ridden by the gods each day when they go to make judgements at Yggdrasil. However, in both poems, Gyllir is not assigned to any specific deity.

Gyllir is also found in the thulur as a giant name.

References

Horses in Norse mythology
Jötnar